Tala Mi Saw was a princess of Hanthawaddy Pegu. A daughter of King Razadarit (r. 1384–1421), Saw was married to Gen. Smin Bayan. She may have been appointed governor of Martaban in 1442 or 1443 by her brother King Binnya Ran I, after the death of her other brother Viceroy Binnya Kyan.

Notes

References

Bibliography
 
 
 
 
 

Hanthawaddy dynasty
1380s births
15th-century deaths